Pteronymia is a genus of clearwing (ithomiine) butterflies, named by Arthur Gardiner Butler and Herbert Druce in 1872. They are in the brush-footed butterfly family, Nymphalidae.

Species
Arranged alphabetically:
Pteronymia alcmena (Godman & Salvin, 1877)
Pteronymia aletta (Hewitson, 1855)
Pteronymia alida (Hewitson, 1855)
Pteronymia alissa (Hewitson, 1869)
Pteronymia artena (Hewitson, 1855)
Pteronymia calgiria Schaus, 1902
Pteronymia cotytto (Guérin-Méneville, [1844])
Pteronymia dispaena (Hewitson, 1876)
Pteronymia donella (C. Felder & R. Felder, [1865])
Pteronymia euritea (Cramer, [1780])
Pteronymia forsteri Baumann, 1985
Pteronymia fulvimargo Butler & H. Druce, 1872
Pteronymia fumida Schaus, 1913
Pteronymia gertschi Fox, 1945
Pteronymia glauca Haensch, 1903
Pteronymia granica (Hewitson, 1877)
Pteronymia hara (Hewitson, 1877)
Pteronymia latilla (Hewitson, 1855)
Pteronymia laura (Staudinger, 1885)
Pteronymia linzera (Herrich-Schäffer, 1864)
Pteronymia lonera (Butler & H. Druce, 1872)
Pteronymia medellina Haensch, 1905
Pteronymia nubivaga Fox, 1947
Pteronymia obscuratus (Fabricius, 1793)
Pteronymia olimba Haensch, 1905
Pteronymia oneida (Hewitson, 1855)
Pteronymia ozia (Hewitson, 1870)
Pteronymia parva (Salvin, 1869)
Pteronymia picta (Salvin, 1869)
Pteronymia primula (Bates, 1862)
Pteronymia rufocincta (Salvin, 1869)
Pteronymia sao (Hübner, [1813])
Pteronymia semonis Haensch, 1909
Pteronymia serrata Haensch, 1903
Pteronymia simplex (Salvin, 1869)
Pteronymia sylvo (Geyer, 1832)
Pteronymia tamina Haensch, 1909
Pteronymia teresita (Hewitson, 1863)
Pteronymia ticida (Hewitson, 1869)
Pteronymia tucuna (Bates, 1862)
Pteronymia veia (Hewitson, 1853)
Pteronymia vestilla (Hewitson, 1853)

References

See also
 Nymphalidae - Brush-footed Butterflies

Ithomiini
Nymphalidae of South America
Nymphalidae genera
Taxa named by Arthur Gardiner Butler
Taxa named by Herbert Druce